Bullard Company No. 2 is a small 0-4-0ST steam tank locomotive which is preserved at the Steamtown National Historic Site.

History
No. 2 was built by H. K. Porter, Inc in October 1937 and spent its working life as an industrial switcher for the Bullard Machine Tool Company in Bridgeport, Connecticut. The locomotive joined the Steamtown, U.S.A. collection in Bellows Falls, Vermont in June 1963 after being purchased by Nelson Blount from the American Machinery Corp, a used locomotive dealer, who had purchased it from the Bullard Machine Tool Company sometime during the 1950s and 1960s. It is now housed in inoperable condition at the Steamtown National Historic Site in Scranton, Pennsylvania. It is among the smallest standard gauge locomotives in the world, being no larger than an average car. It was designed for one-man operation and as such burns oil instead of coal while carrying its water in a saddletank. As of September 2022, the locomotive is undergoing a cosmetic overhaul and is not on public display.

References

External links

Bullard Company No. 2 at the National Park Service

H. K. Porter locomotives
0-4-0ST locomotives
Individual locomotives of the United States
Standard gauge locomotives of the United States
Railway locomotives introduced in 1937
Shunting locomotives
Preserved steam locomotives of Pennsylvania